The 2017–18 Miami RedHawks women's basketball team represents Miami University during the 2017–18 NCAA Division I women's basketball season. The RedHawks, led by first year head coach Megan Duffy, play their home games at Millett Hall, as members of the East Division of the Mid-American Conference. They finished the season 21–11, 12–6 in MAC play to finish in second place in the East Division. They advanced to the semifinals of the MAC women's tournament where they lost to Central Michigan. They received an at-large bid to the Women's National Invitation Tournament where they lost to Duquesne in the first round.

Roster

Schedule

|-
!colspan=9 style=| Exhibition

|-
!colspan=9 style=| Non-conference regular season

|-
!colspan=9 style=| MAC regular season

|-
!colspan=9 style=| MAC Women's Tournament

|-
!colspan=9 style=| WNIT

See also
2017–18 Miami RedHawks men's basketball team

References

2017–18 Mid-American Conference women's basketball season
2017-18
2017 in sports in Ohio
2018 in sports in Ohio
Miami